Prince Said Mohamed Jaffar, full name Said Mohamed Jaffar El Amjad, (born April 14, 1918 in Comoros, and died October 22, 1993) was the 2nd President of Comoros (État comorien) from August 1975 until January 1976, as well as chief minister of the Comoros government from July until December 1972.

Political career
On 3 August 1975 a coalition of six political parties known as the United National Front overthrew the government of Ahmed Abdallah, with the aid of foreign mercenaries led by Bob Denard.

Said Mohamed Jaffar favored a conciliatory approach towards France and the Mayotte issue. On the occasion of the acceptance of the State of Comoros (État comorien) at the United Nations in November 1975 Said Mohamed Jaffar delivered a speech.
In January 1976 Jaffar gave up power to radical leftist leader Ali Soilih.

Exiled in France Said Mohamed Jaffar was elected to the French Senate in 1973.

Said Mohamed Jaffar was Said Atthoumani's uncle. Atthoumani led the short-lived provisional government that ruled the Comoros after Ali Soilih was ousted in a coup in May 1978.

See also
List of heads of state of the Comoros

References

External links
Discours Said Mohamed Djafar - ONU 1975 

1918 births
1993 deaths
Presidents of the Comoros
Foreign ministers of the Comoros
Leaders who took power by coup
Leaders ousted by a coup
French Senators of the Fifth Republic
Senators of French East Africa